Natalie Claire Long (born 13 June 1990) is an Irish rower.

With Sadhbh O'Connor she competed in the Hambleden Pairs Challenge Cup at the 2019 Henley Royal Regatta. She was an alternate for the Irish team at the 2019 World Rowing Championships.

She won a silver medal in the coxless four event at the 2022 European Rowing Championships.

References

External links
 Natalie Long on World Rowing

1990 births
Living people
Irish female rowers
21st-century Irish women
20th-century Irish women